Amanda Anisimova (born August 31, 2001) is a Russian-American professional tennis player. She has a career-high WTA ranking of No. 21 in the world, and has been ranked in the top 100 since shortly after turning 17 years old. Anisimova has won two WTA Tour titles and reached three WTA finals in total.

With her father Konstantin as her longtime coach and her older sister also a tennis player, Anisimova began playing tennis at a very young age. Her parents decided to move to Florida when Anisimova was very young to give their children better training opportunities. As a junior, Anisimova was ranked as high as No. 2 in the world. She won the 2017 US Open girls' singles title, as well as two other Grade-A titles. She also became the first American finalist at the French Open girls' singles event in 14 years. On the WTA Tour, Anisimova rose to prominence at the 2018 Indian Wells Open, where she scored her first top-10 victory at age 16 against Petra Kvitová. She won her first WTA title at the Copa Colsanitas in April 2019 at age 17, and her second title at the Melbourne Summer Set in January 2022 at age 20. 

Her first two breakthroughs at Grand Slam events came in 2019. At the Australian Open, she defeated No. 11 Aryna Sabalenka, one of the leading contenders for the title, to reach the fourth round. At the French Open, she upset Simona Halep, the defending champion and world No. 3, to become the youngest semifinalist at the tournament in over a decade. The next time she reached the fourth round of a major was at the 2022 Australian Open where she won a match against defending champion Naomi Osaka. In 2022 she also reached her first Wimbledon Championships quarterfinal.

Early life and background
Amanda Anisimova was born in Freehold Township, New Jersey to Olga Anisimova and Konstantin Anisimov. She has an older sister, Maria, who played college tennis for the University of Pennsylvania while attending Wharton's undergraduate business school. Her parents emigrated from Russia to the United States a few years before she was born to give their older daughter better opportunities. They worked in the finance and banking industries, and neither played competitive tennis while growing up.

Anisimova started playing tennis at age five. She credits her sister as her inspiration for taking up the sport, saying, "When I was little she was playing tennis. I always saw her playing, and I wanted to do it too. That's how I got into it and my parents got into it too." Her family moved to Florida when she was very young, so Amanda and her sister would have more opportunities to train and find other coaches. Her father long acted as her primary coach while she was a junior, and her mother has also helped coach her. Additionally, she had worked with Nick Saviano starting from when she was 11 years old. Max Fomine, who has also been an assistant coach for the Bryan brothers, has served as her travelling coach.

Junior career

Anisimova achieved a career high ITF junior ranking of No. 2 in the world in 2016. Early in her junior career she entered the 2015 Abierto Juvenil Mexicano ranked outside the top 300, but unexpectedly won the high-level Grade A tournament at age 14. She continued to excel in 2016, winning the Grade 1 Copa del Café and reaching the final at the Grade A Copa Gerdau. On the strength of these results Anisimova was the No. 2 seed at the French Open. In her second career junior Grand Slam tournament, she became the first American finalist at the girls' event since Ashley Harkleroad in 2002 before finishing runner-up to Rebeka Masarova. During the summer, she competed in the USTA Girls' 18s National Championship as the No. 5 seed and finished in 4th place.

As a 15-year-old Anisimova won two more big titles, the first at the Grade 1 Yucatán Cup in late 2016 and the second at the Grade A Copa Gerdau in early 2017 where she had been a finalist a year earlier. Following these titles, she played in only two more ITF junior tournaments that year, both of which were Grand Slams. She capped off her junior career by winning her first Grand Slam title at the US Open, where she defeated fellow American Coco Gauff in the final and did not drop a set during the tournament. Anisimova was also a member of the United States team that won the 2017 Junior Fed Cup, but did not play in the final tie due to illness.

Professional career

2016–17: French Open debut, ITF title
In the middle of 2016, Anisimova received a wildcard into US Open qualifying, her first professional tournament. She won her debut match against world No. 124, Verónica Cepede Royg, at the age of 14, before losing in the following round. Following her junior title at the 2017 Copa Gerdau in February, Anisimova stayed in Brazil and played in a $25K event in Curitiba. She reached her first final on the pro tour at the tournament, despite this being her first professional main draw. A few weeks later, Anisimova was awarded a wildcard into the Miami Open, where she lost to Taylor Townsend, in three sets, in her WTA Tour main-draw debut.

During the clay-court season, Anisimova won the USTA French Open Wildcard Challenge by reaching back-to-back finals at the $80K event in Indian Harbour Beach and the $60K event in Dothan, Alabama the following week. These results also helped her crack the top 300 of the WTA rankings. In her Grand Slam debut, she lost her first-round match at the French Open to Kurumi Nara. Nonetheless, she became the youngest player to participate in the main draw since Alizé Cornet in 2005. After forgoing the grass-court season, Anisimova continued to play on the ITF Pro Circuit. She broke into the top 200 by capturing her first career professional title at the $60K event in Sacramento, California towards the end of July while she was still 15 years old.

2018: Top 100, WTA tournament final, top 10 victory

Anisimova's first two tournaments of the year were the inaugural Challenger Series events at Newport Beach and Indian Wells. She qualified for both main draws, and her semifinal at Indian Wells helped her earn a main-draw wildcard into the WTA Tour event there the following week. At the Indian Wells Open, Anisimova became the youngest player to reach the fourth round since Nicole Vaidišová in 2005. She defeated Pauline Parmentier for her first career WTA Tour match win before upsetting No. 23, Anastasia Pavlyuchenkova, and then No. 9, Petra Kvitová, which ended Kvitová's 14-match win streak. Her run ended against No. 5 Karolína Plíšková. Anisimova was also awarded a wildcard into the Miami Open. She won her opening match against Wang Qiang despite injuring her right foot in the third set. This injury forced her to withdraw from the tournament and kept her out for four months. At the time, she had risen to a career-high ranking of No. 128 in the world.

Anisimova returned to tennis in July at the Silicon Valley Classic. She qualified for the main draw and won her first match back, which was also against Wang Qiang. She then reached the third round of the Cincinnati Open to return to the top 150. After losing her opening match as a wildcard at the US Open, Anisimova next entered the Japan Open. In her first tournament as a 17-year-old, she qualified for the main draw and made it to her first career WTA final, dropping just one set overall and none in the main draw before the final. She defeated top seed and world No. 41, Zhang Shuai, in the semifinals before finishing runner-up to second seed Hsieh Su-wei. With this performance, she cracked the top 100 for the first time.

2019: Maiden WTA Tour title, French Open semifinal & top 25 debut
Anisimova played one tune-up event before the Australian Open, reaching the quarterfinals at the Auckland Open. Despite having never won a singles match at a major, Anisimova made it to the fourth round of the Australian Open. She won her first three matches in straight sets, including a victory over one of the favorites for the title in world No. 11, Aryna Sabalenka, before losing to eventual finalist Petra Kvitová. The following two months, she did not record more than a single match win at any of her next four tournaments.

Having skipped the clay-court season the previous year due to injury, Anisimova entered the Copa Colsanitas in Colombia without any match wins on clay at the WTA level. Nonetheless, she won the tournament for her first WTA title. As the sixth seed, she won four of her five matches in three sets, including the final against Astra Sharma. Anisimova closed out the clay-court season by becoming the youngest semifinalist at the French Open since Vaidišová in 2006. During the tournament, she defeated No. 11 Sabalenka again in the second round and then upset the defending champion and world No. 3, Simona Halep, in the quarterfinals. She did not lose a set until the semifinals when she was defeated by the eventual champion and world No. 8, Ashleigh Barty, despite coming from behind to win the first set, after losing the first five games and needing to save two set points in the sixth game. With this result, she rose to No. 26 in the world.

Anisimova had less success in the second half of the season. Her best result was reaching quarterfinals at the Stanford Classic, where she lost to the eventual champion Zheng Saisai. She dealt with a back injury during the event, which led her to withdraw from both Premier 5 events within the next month. Late in August, she withdrew from the US Open following the death of her father. She entered two more tournaments afterwards, winning one match in total before ending her year early. Nonetheless, she reached as high as No. 21 in the world near the end of the season. She qualified for the WTA Elite Trophy, the second-tier year-end championships, but did not accept the invitation.

2020–21: French and US Open third rounds, loss of form & out of top 75
Anisimova began the year at the Auckland Open, where, after defeating Kateryna Kozlova, Daria Kasatkina, and Eugenie Bouchard, she fell to Serena Williams in the semifinals.

2022: Wimbledon quarterfinal, second WTA Tour title & back to top 25
Anisimova started the season at the Melbourne Summer Set 2 and made the final, her first final appearance since 2019. She won the title by defeating Aliaksandra Sasnovich.

At the Australian Open, Anisimova came from a set down and saved two match points in the final set to defeat reigning champion, Naomi Osaka, in three sets in the third round. This marked the second time she has beaten a defending champion at a major, having beaten Simona Halep at the 2019 French Open. She subsequently lost to world No. 1 and eventual champion, Ash Barty, in the fourth round, in straight sets. As a result she moved 19 positions up in the rankings to No. 41 on 31 January 2022.

In Doha, she lost in the second round to Jeļena Ostapenko.

At the Madrid Open, she reached the quarterfinals defeating two Belarusian players en-route, top-10 player Aryna Sabalenka, her fifth top-10 win and world No. 17, Victoria Azarenka, for the tenth top-20 win of her career. In the quarterfinals, she lost to Ekaterina Alexandrova.

At Wimbledon, she reached quarterfinals at this major for the first time in her career defeating Harmony Tan, but not before defeating 11th seed Coco Gauff in the previous round. In the quarter finals, Anisimova lost to Simona Halep in straight sets. Anisimova hit 28 unforced errors compared to 6 for Halep.

At the US Open, Anisimova lost in the first round to Yulia Putintseva, in straight sets, still recovering from a foot injury at the Western & Southern Open.

2023: Poor season start
Anisimova started her season at the Adelaide International 1, and lost in the second round to Beatriz Haddad Maia at Adelaide International 2. At the 2023 Australian Open, seeded No. 28, Anisimova lost in the first round to Marta Kostyuk, in straight sets.

Playing style
Anisimova is an aggressive baseliner, with powerful groundstrokes from both wings. Her two-handed backhand is her most potent weapon, and is hit consistently with depth, speed, and power; she produces many winners with her backhand down-the-line. Her forehand is also strong, and is hit flat with a condensed swing, allowing her to generate sharp angles with this stroke. She can hit her forehand effectively at any ball height, rendering her forehand deadly on any surface. She is fast around the court, and her footwork is quick and intricate, allowing her to extend rallies until she can create an opportunity to hit a winner. One of her greatest strengths is her return of serve, especially when returning second serves, neutralising powerful serves with a crosscourt inside-out forehand or a backhand down-the-line, making her one of the most effective returners on the WTA Tour. The cleanness of her ball-striking, point construction, and powerful groundstrokes make her a formidable opponent on any surface.

Personal life
Anisimova is currently dating Tyler Roos, a former The Amazing Race Australia contestant and the son of Australian rules football legend Paul Roos.

Endorsements
Anisimova is sponsored by Nike for clothing and shoes, and by Wilson for racquets. She is also sponsored by Gatorade and Therabody.

Career statistics

Grand Slam performance timelines

Singles

Doubles

References

External links
 
 

2001 births
Living people
American female tennis players
People from Freehold Township, New Jersey
Sportspeople from Monmouth County, New Jersey
Tennis people from New Jersey
US Open (tennis) junior champions
American people of Russian descent
Grand Slam (tennis) champions in girls' singles
21st-century American women